Sus og dus på by'n (Carefree in the City) is a Norwegian comedy film in three episodes from 1968. It stars Arve Opsahl, Carsten Byhring, and Aud Schønemann. The film consists of three sequences, directed by Knut Andersen, Knut Bohwim, and Mattis Mathiesen, respectively.

It is one of many films based on books by the writer Egil Lian. His novel Sus og dus på by'n was published by Cappelen in 1965.

Directors of individual sequences 
 Knut Andersen: Oss rosemalere imellom (Among Us Rosemaling Painters)
 Knut Bohwim: Fyrstens testamente (The Prince's Will)
 Mattis Mathiesen: Det private initiativ (The Private Initiative)

Plot
The main characters in the story are Slegga, Reven, and Nelly. Slegga (Sledgehammer) is big and strong, kind, and maybe a little stupid. Reven (the Fox) is a completely different type. He is smart and a driven petty criminal. Nelly is also on the wrong side of the law, but her heart is in the right place. The trio go in and out of prison, but they find each other when they are all at large. The film's three sequences portray the jailbirds' activities and circle of friends in Oslo's underworld.

Cast

 Carsten Byhring as Reven 
 Arve Opsahl as Slegga 
 Aud Schønemann as Nelly 
 Kaare Gundersen as a policeman
 Henry R. Hagerup as a scrap dealer 
 Per Hagerup as a policeman 
 Alf Hallgren as a policeman 
 Solfrid Heier as Olga 
 Sverre Holm as a policeman 
 Ola Isene as a whimsical character with a wild duck in the attic 
 Willy Kreim as a policeman 
 Bernt Lindekleiv
 Rolf Nannestad as an attic tenant 
 Jan Pande-Rolfsen as a policeman 
 Siri Rom as Mrs. Kreim 
 Anders Sundby as a policeman 
 Ottar Wicklund as a policeman 
 Sverre Wilberg as the car dealer

References

External links 
 
 Sus og dus på by'n at the National Library of Norway
 Sus og dus på by'n at Filmfront

1968 films
1960s Norwegian-language films
Norwegian comedy films
Films directed by Knut Andersen
Films directed by Knut Bohwim
1968 comedy films